German Olegovich Onugkha (born 6 July 1996) is a Russian professional footballer who plays as a forward for Danish First Division club Vejle Boldklub.

Club career
He made his debut in the Russian Professional Football League for FC Zenit Penza on 1 September 2017 in a game against FC Ryazan.

He made his Russian Football National League debut for FC Volgar Astrakhan on 4 March 2018 in a game against FC Khimki.

He made his debut for the main squad of FC Krasnodar on 25 September 2019 in a Russian Cup game against FC Nizhny Novgorod. He made his Russian Premier League debut for Krasnodar on 5 July 2020 in a game against FC Zenit Saint Petersburg, replacing Marcus Berg in the 82nd minute.

On 11 August 2020, he joined FC Tambov on loan for the 2020–21 season, with an option to purchase. On 26 January 2021, the loan was terminated early.

On 1 February 2021, he joined Vejle on loan until 30 June 2021, with an option to purchase. On 4 July 2021, Krasnodar announced that Vejle purchased Onugkha's rights.

On 14 July 2021, he joined PFC Krylia Sovetov Samara on loan for the 2021–22 season, with an option to purchase. On 1 September 2021, he was recalled from his loan at Krylia Sovetov and was loaned to FC Rubin Kazan for the season, with an option to purchase. Rubin did not exercise the purchase option.

Personal life
He was born to a Russian mother and a Nigerian father.

Career statistics

References

External links
 
 
 Profile by Russian Professional Football League

1996 births
Footballers from Moscow
Living people
Russian footballers
Association football forwards
FC Volgar Astrakhan players
FC Krasnodar-2 players
FC Krasnodar players
FC Tambov players
Vejle Boldklub players
PFC Krylia Sovetov Samara players
FC Rubin Kazan players
Bnei Sakhnin F.C. players
Russian Premier League players
Russian First League players
Russian Second League players
Danish Superliga players
Danish 1st Division players
Israeli Premier League players
Russian expatriate footballers
Expatriate men's footballers in Denmark
Russian expatriate sportspeople in Denmark
Expatriate footballers in Israel
Russian expatriate sportspeople in Israel
Russian people of Nigerian descent